The Murder Act 1751 (25 Geo 2 c 37), sometimes referred to as the Murder Act 1752, was an Act of the Parliament of Great Britain.

Provisions
The Act included the provision "for better preventing the horrid crime of murder" "that some further terror and peculiar mark of infamy be added to the punishment", and that "in no case whatsoever shall the body of any murderer be suffered to be buried", by mandating either public dissection or "hanging in chains" of the cadaver. The Act also stipulated that a person found guilty of murder should be executed two days after being sentenced unless the third day was a Sunday, in which case the execution would take place on the following Monday.

On 1 July 1828, this Act was repealed, as to England, by section 1 of the Offences Against the Person Act 1828 (9 Geo 4 c 31), except so far as it related to rescues and attempts to rescue. The corresponding marginal note to that section says that effect of this was to repeal the whole Act, except for sections 9 and 10.

Section 1
This section was repealed by section 1 of, and the Schedule to, the Statute Law Revision Act 1871.

Section 9
This section provided that any person who, by force, set at liberty or rescued, or who attempted to set at liberty or rescue, any person out of prison who was committed for, or convicted of, murder, or who rescued or attempted to rescue, any person convicted of murder, going to execution or during execution, was guilty of felony, and was to suffer death without benefit of clergy. This death penalty was reduced to transportation for life by the Punishment of Offences Act (1837).

Section 11
This section was repealed by section 1 of, and the Schedule to, the Statute Law Revision Act 1871.

See also
Murder in English law

Notes

References

Further reading

Marks, Alfred (1908). Tyburn tree : its history and annals,  London : Brown, Langham pp. 247–48

Murder in the United Kingdom
Great Britain Acts of Parliament 1751